Zid Abou Hamed (born 4 April 1970) is an Australian-Syrian former track and field athlete who specialized in the 400 metres hurdles.

Career
Hamed originally began to compete for his birth country Syria. He represented the country at the World Championships in 1991 and 1993.

Hamed then changed his nationality to Australia but was ineligible for the 1996 Summer Olympics but started at the World Championships in the 1997 and 1999 World Championships. In February 1999 in Sydney he achieved a career best time of 48.87 seconds.

When Hamed was not selected for the 2000 Summer Olympics in Sydney, he appealed to the Australian Olympic Committee but lost. As a result, he competed for Syria at the Olympics instead.

International competitions

References

External links 
 
 
 
 
 
 Zid Abou Hamed at Australian Athletics Historical Results

1970 births
Living people
Australian male hurdlers
Syrian male hurdlers
Olympic athletes of Syria
Athletes (track and field) at the 2000 Summer Olympics
Commonwealth Games competitors for Australia
Athletes (track and field) at the 1998 Commonwealth Games
World Athletics Championships athletes for Syria
World Athletics Championships athletes for Australia
Syrian emigrants to Australia
Mediterranean Games gold medalists for Syria
Athletes (track and field) at the 1991 Mediterranean Games
Athletes (track and field) at the 1993 Mediterranean Games
Athletes (track and field) at the 1997 Mediterranean Games
Mediterranean Games medalists in athletics